WVOP (970 AM) is a radio station broadcasting a talk format and licensed to Vidalia, Georgia, United States. The station is currently owned by Dennis Jones, through licensee RadioJones, LLC, and features programming from ABC Radio and Jones Radio Network.

On February 1, 2010, WVOP changed format from oldies to news and talk.

References

External links

VOP